The Baptist Bible Fellowship International (BBFI) is a conservative Baptist Christian denomination.  It is headquartered in Springfield, Missouri.

History
The Fellowship was founded during a meeting in 1950 at Fort Worth in 1950 by a group of 100 pastors of the World Baptist Fellowship who disagreed with the authoritative direction of the leader. That same year, the Baptist Bible College and the organization's headquarters were established in Springfield, Missouri. It has established various  fundamentalists Baptist Bible churches around the world. In 2000, it had 4,500 churches and 1,200,000 members. According to a denomination census released in 2020, it has 4,000 churches in the United States and has a presence in 80 countries.

Programs
There are three functions of the Baptist Bible Fellowship International. Worldwide missions, training, and communication.

The Baptist Bible Tribune, published monthly, contains numerous opinion pieces, reports from the foreign mission field, reports from domestic churches, and light theological treatises. It is written by BBFI officers, pastors, and missionaries and is the official voice of the BBFI. Since 2015, the editor is Randy Harp who was preceded by Keith Bassham.

The organizational structure includes the president, vice-presidents, secretary, treasurer, and one director from each state elected by his own state fellowship. Within this organization, there are state fellowships in each of the fifty United States.

Beliefs 
The Fellowship has a Baptist confession of faith. Their beliefs are part of the  fundamentalist movement.

See also
 Christianity in the United States

References

External links
Baptist Bible Fellowship International Web Site
Baptist Bible Fellowship Missions Web Site
Baptist Bible Tribune
Profile of BBFI on the Association of Religion Data Archives website

Christian organizations established in 1950
Independent Baptist denominations
Baptist denominations established in the 20th century
1950 establishments in Texas
Conservative organizations in the United States